This is a list of supermarket chains in Indonesia.

Current supermarket chains

 Ada Supermarket
 ÆON
 Alfamidi
 Farmers Market
 Transmart (formerly Carrefour) 
 The Foodhall (formerly Sogo Supermarket) 
 Foodmart
 Indogrosir
 Indomaret Fresh
 Grand Lucky
 Groserindo
 Hero
 Hypermart
 Kem Chicks
 LuLu Hypermarket 
 Tip Top Supermarket
 Lotte Mart (formerly Makro)
 SPAR
 Super Indo
 Primo Supermarket
 Gelael Supermarket
 Total Buah Segar 
 Yogya Supermarket
 Robinson Supermarket
 Ranch Market
 Papaya Fresh Gallery
 Prima Freshmart
 K3Mart
 Scan and Go

Defunct supermarket chains

 Carrefour (taken over by Transmart) 
 Makro (taken over by Lotte Mart)
 Giant (taken over by Hero) 
 Sogo Supermarket (taken over by The Foodhall)

References

Indonesia
Supermarkets of Indonesia
Retail companies of Indonesia
Supermarket chains